Stellaria is a genus of about 190 species of flowering plants in the family Caryophyllaceae, with a cosmopolitan distribution. Common names include starwort, stitchwort and chickweed.

Description
Stellaria species are relatively small herbs with simple opposite leaves. It produces small flowers with 5 sepals and 5 white petals each usually deeply cleft, or none at all, all free. Stamens 10 or fewer.

Uses
Some species, including Stellaria media which is widely distributed throughout the Northern Hemisphere, are used as leaf vegetables, often raw in salads. This is a favored food of finches and many other seed-eating birds.

Chickweeds are used as food plants by the larvae of some Lepidoptera species including angle shades, heart and dart, riband wave, setaceous Hebrew character and the Coleophora case-bearers C. coenosipennella (feeds exclusively on Stellaria species), C. lineolea (recorded on S. graminea), C. lithargyrinella (recorded on S. holostea), C. solitariella (feeds exclusively on S. holostea) and C. striatipennella.

Several closely related plants referred to as chickweed, but which lack the culinary properties of plants in the genus Stellaria, include members of the genus Cerastium, of similar appearance to Stellaria and also in the (Carophyllaceae).

Species

The following species are recognised in the genus Stellaria:

 Stellaria abortiva
 Stellaria alaschanica
 Stellaria alaskana
 Stellaria alsine – bog stitchwort
 Stellaria alsinoides
 Stellaria altimontana
 Stellaria amblyosepala
 Stellaria americana
 Stellaria amplexicaulis
 Stellaria anagalloides
 Stellaria angarae
 Stellaria angustifolia
 Stellaria antillana
 Stellaria antoniana
 Stellaria apetala
 Stellaria aphanantha
 Stellaria aphananthoidea
 Stellaria aquatica – water chickweed
 Stellaria arenarioides
 Stellaria arvalis 
 Stellaria australis
 Stellaria bistyla
 Stellaria blatteri
 Stellaria borealis
 Stellaria brachypetala
 Stellaria bungeana
 Stellaria calycantha
 Stellaria celsa
 Stellaria chilensis
 Stellaria chinensis
 Stellaria cilicica
 Stellaria circinata
 Stellaria concinna
 Stellaria congestiflora
 Stellaria corei
 Stellaria crassifolia
 Stellaria crispa
 Stellaria cryptantha
 Stellaria cryptopetala
 Stellaria cuonaensis
 Stellaria cupaniana
 Stellaria cuspidata
 Stellaria darvasievii
 Stellaria davurica
 Stellaria debilis
 Stellaria decipiens
 Stellaria decumbens
 Stellaria delavayi
 Stellaria depauperata
 Stellaria depressa
 Stellaria dianthifolia
 Stellaria dichotoma
 Stellaria dicranoides
 Stellaria discolor
 Stellaria edwardsii
 Stellaria emirnensis
 Stellaria erlangeriana
 Stellaria eschscholtziana
 Stellaria fennica
 Stellaria fenzlii
 Stellaria filicaulis
 Stellaria filiformis
 Stellaria fischeriana
 Stellaria flaccida – forest starwort
 Stellaria gracilenta
 Stellaria graminea – lesser stitchwort
 Stellaria gyangtseensis
 Stellaria gyirongensis
 Stellaria gyirongensis
 Stellaria hebecalyx
 Stellaria henryi
 Stellaria hintoniorum
 Stellaria howardii
 Stellaria humifusa – saltmarsh starwort
 Stellaria imbricata
 Stellaria infracta
 Stellaria inundata
 Stellaria irazuensis
 Stellaria irrigua
 Stellaria jacutica
 Stellaria koelzii
 Stellaria kolymensis
 Stellaria krylovii
 Stellaria laeta
 Stellaria lanata
 Stellaria lanipes
 Stellaria laxmannii
 Stellaria leptoclada
 Stellaria littoralis
 Stellaria longifolia
 Stellaria longipes – long-stalk starwort
 Stellaria mainlingensis
 Stellaria mannii
 Stellaria media – common chickweed
 Stellaria merzbacheri
 Stellaria miahuatlana
 Stellaria minuta
 Stellaria minutifolia
 Stellaria montioides
 Stellaria multiflora
 Stellaria multipartita
 Stellaria neglecta – greater chickweed
 Stellaria nemorum – wood stitchwort
 Stellaria nepalensis
 Stellaria nipponica
 Stellaria nitens
 Stellaria nubigena
 Stellaria obtusa
 Stellaria omeiensis
 Stellaria ovata
 Stellaria ovatifolia
 Stellaria oxycoccoides
 Stellaria palustris – marsh stitchwort
 Stellaria papillata
 Stellaria parviflora 
 Stellaria parviumbellata
 Stellaria patens
 Stellaria pauciflora
 Stellaria pedersenii
 Stellaria peduncularis
 Stellaria pentastyla
 Stellaria persica
 Stellaria petiolaris
 Stellaria pilosoides
 Stellaria pinvalliaca
 Stellaria polyantha
 Stellaria porsildii
 Stellaria procumbens
 Stellaria pterosperma
 Stellaria pubera – star chickweed
 Stellaria pulvinata
 Stellaria pungens – prickly starwort
 Stellaria pusilla
 Stellaria radians
 Stellaria recurvata
 Stellaria reticulivena
 Stellaria rigida
 Stellaria roughii
 Stellaria ruderalis
 Stellaria ruscifolia
 Stellaria salicifolia
 Stellaria sanjuanensis
 Stellaria sarcophylla
 Stellaria scaturiginella
 Stellaria schischkinii
 Stellaria semivestita
 Stellaria sennii
 Stellaria serpens
 Stellaria sessiliflora
 Stellaria sibirica
 Stellaria sikaramensis
 Stellaria sikkimensis
 Stellaria sitchana
 Stellaria soongorica
 Stellaria souliei
 Stellaria strongylosepala
 Stellaria tetrasticha
 Stellaria tibetica
 Stellaria tomentella
 Stellaria turkestanica
 Stellaria uchiyamana
 Stellaria uda
 Stellaria venezuelana
 Stellaria vestita
 Stellaria viridifolia
 Stellaria wallichiana
 Stellaria weddellii
 Stellaria williamsiana
 Stellaria winkleri
 Stellaria xanthospora
 Stellaria yungasensis 
 Stellaria yunnanensis
 Stellaria zangnanensis
 Stellaria zhuxiensis

References

 Edible and Medicinal Plants of the West, Gregory L. Tilford,

External links
 

 
Caryophyllaceae genera
Leaf vegetables
Taxa named by Carl Linnaeus